Ivor Donald Dean (21 December 1917 – 10 August 1974) was a British stage, film and television actor.

Biography
With his lugubrious demeanour he was often cast as world-weary police officers or butlers, and indeed it is for the role of Chief Inspector Claud Eustace Teal in the 1960s series The Saint, opposite Roger Moore, that he is best remembered. Dean played Teal for almost the entire run of the series, except three instances in early episodes where other actors were used. It was on the third occasion, in an episode called Starring The Saint which featured Dean in another role, that the producers saw the ideal actor for the part.

Dean proved the ideal foil for Moore's Simon Templar, invariably one step behind and allegedly hoping for the day when he could pin something on the Saint. Dean's character however seemed to have a respect for his adversary nonetheless. Dean reprised the role in all but name in Randall and Hopkirk (Deceased) (1968–69) in which he played Inspector Large, who had an even more adversarial relationship with (the much less suave) Jeff Randall.

Dean also appeared in one off roles in several other ITC series, including Jason King and The Persuaders!, he appeared as a butler in 3 episodes of the long-running LWT sitcom Doctor at Large and featured in three episodes of The Avengers. In 1964 he played estate agent Alfred Wormold in the long-running soap opera Coronation Street, selling No. 13 Coronation Street to Stan Ogden and his wife Hilda.

Ivor Dean was also a memorable Long John Silver in a Franco-German television adaptation of Treasure Island, entitled Die Schatzinsel / L' île au Tresor (1966). He contributed to a follow-up script with Saint producer Robert S. Baker, but it never materialised before his death, however Baker continued to develop the project and it was finally made as the 10 part serial Return to Treasure Island in 1986, it was scripted by John Goldsmith and the part of Long John Silver was played by Brian Blessed.

His other film appearances include Theatre of Death and the 'Pride' segment of The Magnificent Seven Deadly Sins.

In 1949 Ivor Dean was married to British actress Patricia Hamilton with whom he had three daughters. He died in Truro, Cornwall.

Selected filmography
 Cloak Without Dagger (1956) – Night club proprietor
 Gaolbreak (1962) – Barrington
 Danger by My Side (1962) – Balding Detective at Quarry
 The Sicilians (1963) – Burford
 Becket (1964) – Monk (uncredited)
 Bindle (One of Them Days) (1966) – Mr. Fawcett
 Treasure Island (Die Schatzinsel) (1966) - Long John Silver
 Stranger in the House (1967) – Insp. Colder
 The Sorcerers (1967) – Insp. Matalon
 The Magnificent Two (1967) – Adviser (uncredited)
 Theatre of Death (1967) – Inspector Micheaud
 Robbery (1967) – Postal Worker on Train (uncredited)
 Prudence and the Pill (1968) – City Banker in Taxi Cab (uncredited)
 Salt and Pepper (1968) – Police Commissioner
 Decline and Fall... of a Birdwatcher (1968) – Old Bailey Policeman
 Where Eagles Dare (1968) – German Officer No. 2 (uncredited)
 Crooks and Coronets (1969) – Bellows
 The File of the Golden Goose (1969) – Reynolds
 The Oblong Box (1969) – Hawthorne
 Dr. Jekyll and Sister Hyde (1971) – William Burke
 The Magnificent Seven Deadly Sins (1971) – Policeman (segment "Pride")
 Never Mind the Quality, Feel the Width (1973) – Bishop Rourke

References

External links
 

1917 births
1974 deaths
Male actors from London
English male film actors
English male television actors
20th-century English male actors